The first recorded landing of Russians in Japan (Zai-Nichi Roshia-jin) was in 1739 in Kamogawa, Chiba during the times of Japanese seclusion of the Edo period, not counting landings in Hokkaidō, which was not under Japanese administration at these times.

Japanese people are partly descended from populations originating in the Russian Far East.

Russian missions 
The Russian Mission, or Orthodox Church of Russia in Japan, dates from 1861. A hospital had been previously built at Hakodate for Russians and Japanese. The Rev. Nikolai Kasatkin (later St Nicholas of Japan), was attached to it as chaplain with a church near the hospital. The hospital was destroyed by fire, though the church remained and Nicholas stayed as a missionary at Hakodate, where he baptized a number of Japanese. In 1870 the Russian minister to Japan obtained a grant of a special territory as a branch of the Russian legation at Surugadai at the very center of Tokyo. Here Father Nicholas established his residence and the center of the Orthodox Church. He began by training well-instructed men and native assistants, for which purpose he had an ordinary college and a school of philosophy and theology; later on he also had a special school for young women. He preached his religion by means of carefully trained catechists and priests. From 1881 he also had a religious review, published twice monthly and a publication committee installed at his house published many books. In 1886 Fr Nicholas was consecrated bishop in Russia and in 1890 he completed the erection of his cathedral.

Bishop Nicholas enjoyed a great personal esteem; he founded and governed everything pertaining to his mission. During the Russo-Japanese War the situation was very delicate, but the Christians, at least the greater number of them, did not abandon him. Even during this time he continued all his undertakings unmolested, his house being guarded by Japanese soldiers. Prior to that, he received from the Holy Synod 95,000 yen yearly, but during the Russo-Japanese War, these and other resources from Russia were greatly diminished, while on the other hand the price of everything in Japan increased. The bishop was compelled to diminish his expenses, to dismiss part of his staff and to exhort the Christians to contribute more generously to support their church.

After the victories of the Japanese over the Russian armies, the Christians leaders, after having agreed among themselves, declared to Archbishop Nicholas their intention to support themselves, independent of Russia. As Russia has its national church they wished to have also their Japanese National Church.

Little has been written concerning the work of the Russians in Japan; even in Russia almost nothing has been published. According to one Protestant reckoning, the Orthodox church numbered 30,166 baptized Christians; according to another only 13,000 (the last figure denotes perhaps practicing members). There were 37 native priests and 139 catechists. Expenses for church and evangelization in 1907 amounted to 55,279 yen; contributions of Christians, 10,711 yen; Churches or places of preaching, 265. Among the Russians, as among Protestants, and everywhere throughout Japan, the tendency was toward independence.

Russian Revolution 

After the Russian Revolution and Russian Civil War, about 2,000,000 Russian refugees who did not accept the Bolshevik rule entered mostly the United States and Europe. Some of them settled in the Home Islands of Japan. Traditionally these refugees have been known as White Russians, with the corresponding Japanese term being Hakkei-Roshiajin, a term which has been applied to all former residents of the former Russian Empire.

Initially the majority of Russians lived in Tokyo and Yokohama. After the Great Kantō earthquake of 1923 a significant number of them moved to Kobe.

A white émigré family is depicted in the novel The Makioka Sisters by famed Japanese author Junichiro Tanizaki.

Modern times 
As of 2005, the statistics of Japanese government reported 37,000 Russians enter Japan yearly on average, not counting temporary landing permits of seamen and tourists. The number of Russians that stay in Japan longer than 90 days (the maximal duration of a temporary visa in Japan) is about 6,000.

The Russian Embassy School in Tokyo serves Russian diplomat families in Tokyo.

Notable individuals

 Victor Starffin
 Kaori Kawamura
Anna Murashige
 Kento Masuda
 Nicholas of Japan

Fictional people
 Victor Nikiforov and Yuri Plisetsky, two Russian characters from Yuri on Ice
 Simon Brezhnev and Vorona from Durarara!!
 Erast Fandorin, from Boris Akunin's novels, described as the Russian Vice-Consul in Yokohama.
 Lev Haiba, a half-Russian, half-Japanese character from Haikyu!!
 Anastasia from The Idolmaster Cinderella Girls

See also
 Nikolay Rezanov, the first Russian ambassador in Japan
 Japanese language education in Russia
 Ethnic groups of Japan

References

Citations

Sources 

 
 Sawada Kazuhiko, Nihon ni okeru hakkei-Roshia-jin no bunka-teki eikyo (Cultural impact of White Russians in Japan), in Naganawa Mitsuo and Sawada Kazuhiko, eds., Ikyo ni ikiru — Rai-Nichi Roshia-jin no sokuseki (Living in a foreign land: Traces of Russian residents in Japan) (Yokohama, 2001), 31–46; Zai Honpo gaikokujin ni kansuru tokei chosa zakken (Miscellaneous statistical data on foreign residents in Japan, vol. 1, K–3–7–0–15, Diplomatic Record Office, Japanese Ministry of Foreign Affairs)
 Podalko, Petr E. "The Russian Community in Kobe: A Historical Overview." 青山国際政経論集 70 (2006): 103–127.
 Podalko, Petr Ėduardovič. Japonija v sudʹbach rossijan: očerki istoriii carskoj diplomatii i rossijskoj diaspory v Japonii (Japan in Russian people's lives: Essays on the history of the Czarist diplomacy and the Russian diaspora in Japan). Moscow: Institut vostokovedenija RAN, 2004.
 Nakamura Yoshikazu, Naganawa Mitsuo, Podaruko Pyōtoru, eds., Rainichi Roshiajin no sokuseki. Yokohama-shi: Seibunsha, 2008.

External links 
 Russian Tokyo community

Ethnic groups in Japan
European diaspora in Japan

Japan–Russia relations
Russian diaspora in Asia
Japan